San Michele in Foro is a Roman Catholic basilica church in Lucca, Tuscany, central Italy, built over the ancient Roman forum. Until 1370 it was the seat of the Consiglio Maggiore (Major Council), the commune's most important assembly. It is dedicated to Archangel Michael.

History
The church is mentioned for the first time in 795 as ad foro (in the forum). It was rebuilt after 1070 by will of Pope Alexander II.

Notable is the façade, from the 13th century, with a large series of sculptures and inlays, numerous of which remade in the 19th century. The lower part has a series of blind arcades, the central of which includes the main portal. The upper part, built using plenty of iron materials to counter wind, has four orders of small loggias. On the summit, flanked by two other angels, is the 4 m-tall statue of St. Michael the Archangel. According to a legend, an angel's finger would have a huge diamond. On the lower right corner of the façade is a statue (1480) of the Madonna salutis portus, sculpted by Matteo Civitali to celebrate the end of the 1476 plague.

The church interior has a nave and two aisles with transept and semicircular apse; the nave is supported by arcades on monolithic columns. From the southern transept rises the bell tower, built in the 12th-14th centuries, with a series of single, double and triple mullioned windows. The last floor was demolished during the rule of Giovanni dell'Agnello (1364-1368), Doge of Pisa.

Gallery

Amongst the artworks in the interior, are a Madonna with Child terracotta by Luca della Robbia and a panel with Four Saints by Filippino Lippi.

See also
Romanesque architecture
 Saint Michael (Roman Catholic)

External links
Page with numerous sculpture details 
HD 360° Panoramic Interactive Photo of San Michele in Foro Square Made by Hans von Weissenfluh for Tuscany tourism promotion official website.

Michele in Foro
Michele In Foro
Michele in Foro